The South African PGA Championship is one of the most prestigious golf tournaments on the Sunshine Tour. It is generally played in February, depending on the Tour Schedule, with a prize fund of 2 million rand, and is currently held at Eye of Africa Signature Golf Estate in the Johannesburg suburb of Eikenhof.

History 
The current South African PGA Championship was founded in 1965, largely thanks to Gary Player and Brian Henning. The inaugural event was held in February 1965 and was won by Harold Henning who beat Player by 3 strokes.

New sponsors in 1972 gave the championship a home at The Wanderers Golf Club where it remained until 1995, when it became the first tournament in South Africa to be co-sanctioned by the European Tour. The following year Alfred Dunhill took over from Lexington as title sponsors, breaking a 23-year association with the PGA.

Following the 1999 event, Dunhill decided to end their association with the South African PGA and create their own tournament, the Alfred Dunhill Championship, which also replaced the PGA Championship on the European calendar. As a result, there was no PGA Championship held in 2000, but the tournament returned to the Sunshine Tour the following year with a new sponsor. It is one of the richest sole-sanctioned events on the Sunshine Tour.

The South African PGA Championship, along with the South African Open and the South African Masters formed the Triple Crown of South African golf. Winning all three titles in the same season is a feat only achieved by Bobby Locke, Gary Player and Ernie Els.

Winners

Notes

References

External links
Sunshine Tour – official site
Professional Golfers Association of South Africa – official site
Coverage on the European Tour's official site (1995–1999)

Sunshine Tour events
Former European Tour events
Golf tournaments in South Africa
Sports competitions in Johannesburg
Recurring sporting events established in 1965
1965 establishments in South Africa